The 2013 Oregon Ducks football team represented the University of Oregon in the 2013 NCAA Division I FBS football season. The team was led by first year head coach Mark Helfrich and played their home games at Autzen Stadium for the 47th consecutive year. They were a member of the Pac-12 Conference in the North Division.

Previous season

Summary
The Ducks had high expectations to make a run at a BCS national championship title. This was the first year under new head coach Mark Helfrich, after the departure of Chip Kelly to the NFL in the previous year. They were undefeated up to November 7, 2013, where they lost to Stanford, dimming their national championship aspirations. Their second loss of the season to Arizona on November 23, 2013, finally ended any chance of a national or conference championship. They were passed over for an at-large BCS bid at #10 in the country, and were selected to be the Pac-12 representative to the Alamo bowl. In the bowl game, they defeated the Texas 30-7.  They finished the year #9 in the Coaches and AP Polls.

Departing players
No Juniors or Redshirt-Sophomores declared early eligibility for the 2013 NFL draft.

Pre-season

Returning starters

Offense

Defense

Special teams

Recruiting

Awards watch lists

The following Oregon players appeared on preseason award watch lists

Maxwell Award – College Football Player of the Year
 Marcus Mariota
 De'Anthony Thomas

Walter Camp Award – Player of the Year
 Marcus Mariota
 De'Anthony Thomas

Davey O'Brien Award – Best Quarterback
 Marcus Mariota

Doak Walker Award – Best Runningback
 De'Anthony Thomas

Biletnikoff Award – Best Receiver
 Josh Huff

Mackey Award – Most Outstanding Collegiate Tight End
 Colt Lyerla

Rimington Trophy – Most Outstanding Collegiate Center
 Hroniss Grasu

Outland Trophy – Best Interior Lineman in College Football
 Hroniss Grasu
 Tyler Johnstone

Lombardi Award – Best Lineman
 Hroniss Grasu
 Tyler Johnstone

Bednarik Award – Defensive Player of the Year
 Ifo Ekpre-Olomu

Bronko Nagurski Trophy – Most Outstanding Defensive Player
 Ifo Ekpre-Olomu
 Terrence Mitchell

Jim Thorpe Award – Best Defensive Back
 Ifo Ekpre-Olomu
 Terrence Mitchell

Butkus Award – Best Linebacker
 Boseko Lokombo

Spring football

On April 27, 2013 the Oregon Ducks capped off their spring football practices with the traditional Spring Football Game, open to the public held at Autzen Stadium. As has been the practice for many years, in order to gain admission to the game each fan must donate at least three non-perishable food items to Food for Lane County on their way in the stadium. Following a record donation year in 2012, Oregon fans again donated over 70,000 pounds of food to the charity.

Donating food is not the only non-football activity for a good cause that is associated with the Oregon Spring Game, the game is played in honor of the United States Armed Forces and specifically the several reserve and guard units stationed close to Eugene. The football players will wear special made Nike uniforms that have "Support Our Troops" on the back where the player's last name is usually found, along with American Flags on the sleeves. During half-time a group of Marine Corps enlistees took the oath of enlistment on the field. Following the game the players line up on the north sideline, with an equal number of service-members from each branch of the military lining up on the south sideline. The two groups meet in the middle of the field where the players then remove their jersey and give it to a service-member, the service-member in turns presents the football player with a challenge coin. The tradition of the Spring Game being dedicated to supporting the military is part of the legacy of former head coach Chip Kelly, following the funeral of a local soldier in 2010, which he attended.

The 2013 iteration of the game was the first under new head coach Mark Helfrich and it also implemented a new scoring system for the first time in several years. Traditionally the offensive and defensive coordinators act as head coaches of two different teams, which are selected via a draft, the two teams then face off in a normally scored exhibition game. Due to a rash of injuries on both sides of the ball the format was tweaked so that it was simply the offense versus the defense, with a modified points system. The offense would score normally, with six points for touchdowns with the opportunity for point after attempts, and three points for field goals. The defense would follow normal rules for touchdowns as well, but would also gain three points for turnovers and one point every time that they kept the offense from scoring. The points system led to a lopsided victory by the offense, 65–0.

Schedule

Personnel

Coaching staff

Roster

Depth chart

Game summaries

Nicholls State

Virginia

Tennessee

California

Colorado

Washington

Washington State

UCLA

Stanford

Utah

Arizona

Oregon State – 117th Civil War

Texas – Alamo Bowl

Rankings

After the season

Team records broken
 Total Offense – Team

Total Offense – Single Season

Receiving Yards – Single Season

Kickoff Return Yards – Career

Players drafted
The following Oregon players were selected in the 2014 NFL Draft.

All-Americans
Hroniss Grasu, Junior, Center (SI, Athlon)
Ifo Ekpre-Olomu, Junior, Cornerback (ESPN)

Statistics

Team

Offense

Defense

Key: POS: Position, SOLO: Solo Tackles, AST: Assisted Tackles, TOT: Total Tackles, TFL: Tackles-for-loss, SACK: Quarterback Sacks, INT: Interceptions, BU: Passes Broken Up, PD: Passes Defended, QBH: Quarterback Hits, FF: Forced Fumbles, FR: Fumbles Recovered, BLK: Kicks or Punts Blocked, SAF: Safeties

Special teams

Notes
 October 6, 2013 – Colt Lyerla, the starting tight end at the beginning of the season, quits the team "for his own benefit".
 October 19, 2013 – Following a 62–38 win over Washington State, in which Washington State attempted an NCAA record 89 passes, Oregon Defensive Coordinator Nick Aliotti, during his post-game talk with the press, said the following:

"That's total (B.S.) that he threw the ball at the end of the game like he did, and you can print that and you can send it to him, and he can comment, too. I think it's low class and it's (B.S.) to throw the ball when the game is completely over against our kids that are basically our scout team."
 October 20, 2013 – Oregon Defensive Coordinator Nick Aliotti publicly apologizes for his comments regarding Washington State made the previous evening.
 October 21, 2013 – The Pac-12 Conference reprimands Oregon Defensive Coordinator Nick Aliotti and fines him $5,000 for comments made about Washington State on October 19.
 October 23, 2013 – Colt Lyerla is arrested for possession of cocaine and interfering with a police officer.
 December 3, 2013 – Starting quarterback Marcus Mariota (RSo.) and starting center Hroniss Grasu (Jr.) announce that they will bypass the NFL Draft and return for the 2014 season.
 December 7, 2013 – Starting defensive end Tony Washington (Jr.) and starting linebacker Derrick Malone (Jr.) announce that they will bypass the NFL Draft and return for the 2014 season.
 December 10, 2013 – Starting tight end Pharoah Brown is suspended for the Alamo Bowl due to his role in a campus snowball fight on December 6 that got out of hand.
 December 13, 2013 – Defensive back Troy Hill is suspended from all football-related activities after being arrested for fourth-degree assault, menacing and strangulation.
 December 16, 2013 – Troy Hill is arraigned on lesser charges of menacing and criminal mischief; he enters a plea of not guilty.
 December 27, 2013 – Oregon Defensive Coordinator Nick Aliotti announces that he will retire following the Alamo Bowl. Aliotti played the running back position at UC Davis from 1972 to 1976; in 1978 he got his first coaching job as a graduate assistant at the University of Oregon under coach Rich Brooks. From 1980 to 1983, he was the running backs coach at Oregon State under coach Joe Avezzano. He then took a coaching job under future Oregon coach Mike Bellotti, as the offensive coordinator and offensive line coach at Chico State from 1984 to 1987. He followed Bellotti to Oregon in 1988, coaching outside linebackers from 1988 to 1992 and rising to the defensive coordinator's job from 1993 to 1994. Following the 1994 Rose Bowl Season, he followed Oregon head coach Rich Brooks to the NFL, coaching special teams for him with the St. Louis Rams from 1995 to 1997. After Brooks left the Rams, Aliotti returned to college coaching, as the defensive coordinator for UCLA in 1998. In 1999, Bellotti lured Aliotti back to Oregon, where he has coached as the defensive coordinator ever since.
 January 3, 2014 – Starting cornerback Terrance Mitchell (Jr.) announces that he is forgoing his senior year and declaring early eligibility for the NFL Draft.
 January 5, 2014 – Starting running back De'Anthony Thomas (Jr.) announces that he will forgo his senior year and enter the NFL Draft.
 January 6, 2014 – Starting cornerback Ifo Ekpre-Olomu (Jr.) announces that he will bypass the NFL Draft and return to Oregon for his senior season.

References

Oregon
Oregon Ducks football seasons
Alamo Bowl champion seasons
Oregon Ducks football